Cotter High School can refer to:

Cotter High School (Winona, Minnesota)
Cotter High School (Cotter, Arkansas)